HMIS Tir was a  of the Royal Indian Navy (RIN). She was acquired from the Royal Navy where she served as HMS Bann during World War II. She was commissioned into the RIN in December 1945.

She was converted into a midshipman's training ship in Bombay in 1948. After the Indian independence she was inducted into the Indian Navy as INS Tir. In 1953 she took part in the Fleet Review to celebrate the Coronation of Queen Elizabeth II.

She was decommissioned in 1977. An oil painting of the ship hangs at the Indian Naval Headquarters in New Delhi.

References

Publications
 

River-class frigates of the Royal Indian Navy
River-class frigates of the Indian Navy
1942 ships
Training ships of the Indian Navy